So Many Roads may refer to:

 So Many Roads, a 1965 album by John P. Hammond
 So Many Roads, a 1976 album by Otis Rush
 So Many Roads (1965–1995), a compilation album by The Grateful Dead
 So Many Roads: Live in Europe, a live album by Neal Morse.
 "So Many Roads", a song from album What We Made by Example
 "So Many Roads", a song by John Mayall and Peter Green, included in Looking Back (John Mayall album)
 "So Many Roads", a song by Cuby + Blizzards on their 1967 album, Groeten Uit Grollo

See also
 "So Many Roads, So Many Trains", a train song written by Marshall Paul, also featured on the Hammond album above